Xeropigo is a genus of South American and Caribbean corinnid sac spiders first described by O. Pickard-Cambridge in 1882.

Species
 it contains seventeen species:
Xeropigo aitatu Carvalho, Shimano, Candiani & Bonaldo, 2016 – Brazil
Xeropigo brescoviti De Souza & Bonaldo, 2007 – Bolivia
Xeropigo cajuina Carvalho, Shimano, Candiani & Bonaldo, 2016 – Brazil
Xeropigo camilae De Souza & Bonaldo, 2007 – Brazil
Xeropigo candango De Souza & Bonaldo, 2007 – Brazil
Xeropigo canga Carvalho, Shimano, Candiani & Bonaldo, 2016 – Brazil
Xeropigo cotijuba De Souza & Bonaldo, 2007 – Guiana, Brazil
Xeropigo crispim Carvalho, Shimano, Candiani & Bonaldo, 2016 – Brazil
Xeropigo oxente Carvalho, Shimano, Candiani & Bonaldo, 2016 – Brazil
Xeropigo pachitea De Souza & Bonaldo, 2007 – Peru, Brazil
Xeropigo perene De Souza & Bonaldo, 2007 – Peru, Brazil
Xeropigo piripiri Carvalho, Shimano, Candiani & Bonaldo, 2016 – Brazil
Xeropigo rheimsae De Souza & Bonaldo, 2007 – Brazil
Xeropigo smedigari (Caporiacco, 1955) – Venezuela, Trinidad
Xeropigo tridentiger (O. Pickard-Cambridge, 1870) (type) – USA, Caribbean to Brazil, St. Helena
Xeropigo t. reichardti (Strand, 1916) – Cayman Is. (Grand Cayman)
Xeropigo ufo Carvalho, Shimano, Candiani & Bonaldo, 2016 – Brazil

References

Araneomorphae genera
Corinnidae
Spiders of North America
Spiders of South America